Patterson Peak can refer to the following mountains:

Patterson Peak (Antarctica)
Patterson Peak (Blaine County, Idaho)
Patterson Peak (Custer County, Idaho)
Patterson Peak (New Mexico) in Catron County
Patterson Peak (Nevada) in Lincoln County

References